Rossiulus is a genus of millipedes belonging to the family Julidae.

Species
The following species are recognised in the genus Rossiulus:
 Rossiulus kessleri (Lohmander, 1927) 
 Rossiulus vilnensis (Jawłowski, 1925)

References

Julida
Millipede genera